George Pitt may refer to:

Politics
George Pitt (died 1694) (1625–1694), British Member of Parliament for Wareham
George Pitt (died 1735) (1663–1735), British Member of Parliament for Hampshire, Stockbridge and Old Sarum
George Pitt (died 1745), British Member of Parliament for Wareham and Dorset
George Morton Pitt (1693–1756), administrator of India and later British Member of Parliament for Pontefract
George Pitt, 1st Baron Rivers (1721–1803), British diplomat and politician
George Pitt, 2nd Baron Rivers (1751–1828), British politician
George Dean Pitt (1772–1851 or 1781–1851), British soldier and lieutenant-governor of the former New Zealand Province of New Ulster
George Pitt (Australian politician) (1872–1932)

Other
George Dibdin Pitt (1795–1855), British dramatist
George Cecil Pitt (1767–1820), British musician and father of George Dibdin Pitt